Reoviridae is a family of double-stranded RNA viruses. Member viruses have a wide host range, including vertebrates, invertebrates, plants, protists and fungi. They lack lipid envelopes and package their segmented genome within multi-layered capsids. Lack of a lipid envelope has allowed three-dimensional structures of these large complex viruses (diameter ∼60–100 nm) to be obtained, revealing a structural and likely evolutionary relationship to the cystovirus family of bacteriophage. There are currently 97 species in this family, divided among 15 genera in two subfamilies. Reoviruses can affect the gastrointestinal system (such as rotaviruses) and respiratory tract. The name "reo-" is an acronym for "respiratory enteric orphan" viruses. The term "orphan virus" refers to the fact that some of these viruses have been observed not associated with any known disease. Even though viruses in the family Reoviridae have more recently been identified with various diseases, the original name is still used.

Reovirus infections occur often in humans, but most cases are mild or subclinical. Rotaviruses, however, can cause severe diarrhea and intestinal distress in children, and lab studies in mice have implicated orthoreoviruses in the expression of coeliac disease in pre-disposed individuals. The virus can be readily detected in feces, and may also be recovered from pharyngeal or nasal secretions, urine, cerebrospinal fluid, and blood. Despite the ease of finding reoviruses in clinical specimens, their role in human disease or treatment is still uncertain.

Some viruses of this family, such as phytoreoviruses and oryzaviruses, infect plants. Most of the plant-infecting reoviruses are transmitted between plants by insect vectors. The viruses replicate in both the plant and the insect, generally causing disease in the plant, but little or no harm to the infected insect.

Structure 

Reoviruses are non-enveloped and have an icosahedral capsid composed of an outer (T=13) and inner (T=2) protein shell. Ultrastructure studies show that virion capsids are composed of two or three separate layers which depends on species type. The innermost layer (core) has T=1 icosahedral symmetry and is composed of 60 different types of structural proteins. The core contains the genome segments, each of them encode a variety enzyme structure which is required for transcription. The core is covered by capsid layer T=13 icosahedral symmetry. Reoviruses have a unique structure which is contains a glycolisated spike protein on the surface.

Genome 
The genomes of viruses in family Reoviridae contain 10–12 segments which are grouped into three categories corresponding to their size: L (large), M (medium) and S (small). Segments range from about 0.2 to 3 kbp and each segment encodes 1–3 proteins (10–14 proteins in total). Proteins of viruses in the family Reoviridae are denoted by the Greek character corresponding to the segment it was translated from (the L segment encodes for λ proteins, the M segment encodes for μ proteins and the S segment encodes for σ proteins).

Life cycle

Viruses in the family Reoviridae have genomes consisting of segmented, double-stranded RNA (dsRNA). Because of this, replication occurs exclusively in the cytoplasm, and the virus encodes several proteins which are needed for replication and conversion of the dsRNA genome into positive-sense RNAs.

The virus can enter the host cell via a receptor on the cell surface. The receptor is not known but is thought to include sialic acid and junctional adhesion molecules (JAMs). The virus is partially uncoated by proteases in the endolysosome, where the capsid is partially digested to allow further cell entry. The core particle then enters the cytoplasm by a yet unknown process where the genome is transcribed conservatively causing an excess of positive-sense strands, which are used as messenger RNA templates to synthesize negative-sense strands.

The genome of the rotavirus is divided into 11 segments. These segments are associated with the VP1 molecule which is responsible for RNA synthesizes. In early events, the selection process occurs so that the entry of the 11 different RNA segments go in the cell. This procedure is performed by newly synthesized RNAs. This event ensures that one each of the 11 different RNA segments is received. In late events, the transcription process occurs again but this time is not capped unlike the early events. For virus different amounts of RNAs are required therefore during the translation step there is a control machinery. There are the same quantities of RNA segments but different quantities of proteins. The reason for this is that the RNA segments are not translated at the same rate.

Viral particles begin to assemble in the cytoplasm 6–7 hours after infection. Translation takes place by leaky scanning, suppression of termination, and  ribosomal skipping. The virus exits the host cell by monopartite non-tubule guided viral movement, cell to cell movement, and existing in occlusion bodies after cell death and remaining infectious until finding another host.

Multiplicity reactivation
Multiplicity reactivation (MR) is the process by which two or more virus genomes, each containing inactivating genome damage, can interact within an infected cell to form a viable virus genome. McClain and Spendlove demonstrated MR for three types of reovirus after exposure to ultraviolet irradiation. In their experiments, reovirus particles were exposed to doses of UV-light that would be lethal in single infections. However, when two or more inactivated viruses were allowed to infect individual host cells MR occurred and viable progeny were produced. As they stated, multiplicity reactivation by definition involves some type of repair. Michod et al. reviewed numerous examples of MR in different viruses, and suggested that MR is a common form of sexual interaction in viruses that provides the benefit of recombinational repair of genome damages.

Taxonomy
The family Reoviridae is divided into two subfamilies based on the presence of a "turret" protein on the inner capsid. From ICTV communications: "The name Spinareovirinae will be used to identify the subfamily containing the spiked or turreted viruses and is derived from 'reovirus' and the Latin word 'spina' as a prefix, which means spike, denoting the presence of spikes or turrets on the surface of the core particles. The term 'spiked' is an alternative to 'turreted', that was used in early research to describe the structure of the particle, particularly with the cypoviruses. The name Sedoreovirinae will be used to identify the subfamily containing the non-turreted virus genera and is derived from 'reovirus' and the Latin word 'sedo', which means smooth, denoting the absence of spikes or turrets from the core particles of these viruses, which have a relatively smooth morphology."

The family Reoviridae is divided into the following subfamilies and genera:

 Sedoreovirinae
 Cardoreovirus
 Mimoreovirus
 Orbivirus
 Phytoreovirus
 Rotavirus
 Seadornavirus
 Spinareovirinae
 Aquareovirus
 Coltivirus
 Cypovirus
 Dinovernavirus
 Fijivirus
 Idnoreovirus
 Mycoreovirus
 Orthoreovirus
 Oryzavirus

Therapeutic applications
Although reoviruses are mostly nonpathogenic in humans, these viruses have served as very productive experimental models for studies of viral pathogenesis. Newborn mice are extremely sensitive to reovirus infections and have been used as the preferred experimental system for studies of reovirus pathogenesis.

Reoviruses have been demonstrated to have oncolytic (cancer-killing) properties, encouraging the development of reovirus-based therapies for cancer treatment.

Reolysin is a formulation of reovirus (Mammalian orthoreovirus serotype 3-dearing strain) that is currently in clinical trials for the treatment of various cancers, including studies currently developed to investigate the role of Reolysin combined with other immunotherapies.

See also
 Double-stranded RNA viruses
 Oncolytic virus
 Orphan virus

References

External links

 ICTV: Reoviridae
 Description of plant viruses: Reoviridae
 ViPR: Reoviridae
 

 
Virus families
Riboviria